Herschel Clay Baker (8 November 1914, Cleburne, Texas – 2 February 1990, Belmont, Massachusetts) was an American professor of English literature, specializing in the intellectual history of Christian humanism and its erosion.

Baker's 1947 book The Dignity of Man is a series of chronological studies tracing the development of Christian humanism until the Reformation. His 1952 book on the decay of Christian humanism relies on earlier work by Hardin Craig and Basil Willey.

Baker was a Guggenheim Fellow for the academic years 1956–1957 and 1963–1964. In 1966 he was made an Honorary Doctor of Letters by Southern Methodist University.

Upon his death he was survived by his widow, one son, and two daughters.

Selected publications
 

as editor with Robert Mayer Lumiansky: 
as editor: 
as editor with Hyder Edward Rollins:

References

1914 births
1990 deaths
American academics of English literature
20th-century American non-fiction writers
Southern Methodist University alumni
University of Texas faculty
Harvard University faculty
Harvard University alumni